Amber Midthunder (born April 26, 1997) is an American actress. She is known for her regular roles in the FX series Legion and The CW series Roswell, New Mexico, as well as appearances on Longmire, Banshee, and Reservation Dogs. She starred as Naru in Prey, the fifth installment of the Predator franchise.

Early life
Midthunder's mother Angelique, who is originally from Thailand and of Thai-Chinese ancestry, is a casting director and stunt performer, and her father David is an actor; Angelique and David met while working on the 1995 Japanese film East Meets West. 

Midthunder is a citizen of the Fort Peck Assiniboine and Sioux Tribe. She was born on the Navajo Nation in Shiprock, New Mexico, and eventually returned there after spending much of her childhood in Santa Fe, where she attended the Academy for Technology and the Classics and her mother worked in a casting firm.

Career

Midthunder developed an interest in acting as a child, where she would memorize and recite lines from her favorite shows, but disliked her first experience in the job, leading her to take some time before another performance, even considering a career in make-up, where she worked as an intern, or mixed martial arts, having trained and taught Brazilian jiu-jitsu. Her first credit was in 2008's Sunshine Cleaning. Midthunder proceeded to work in various productions filmed in New Mexico, before moving to Los Angeles at the age of 17 to pursue more acting opportunities.

Awards
In 2022, Midthunder received the Breakthrough Performance Award as part of the Saturn Awards.

Filmography

Film

Television

References

External links
 
 Amber Midthunder On Her ‘Reservation Dogs’ Cameo And The Future Of Indigenous Representation On Screen - Sep 2022 Interview

Living people
21st-century American actresses
21st-century Native Americans
American child actresses
American film actresses
American television actresses
Native American actresses
Native American actors
1997 births
21st-century Native American women
Assiniboine people
American people of Chinese descent
American people of Thai descent
Fort Peck Assiniboine and Sioux Tribes people